Acrolophus spilotus is a moth of the family Acrolophidae. It was described by Davis in 1990. It is found in North America, including Alabama, Florida, Mississippi and Texas.

The wingspan is about 16 mm.

References

Moths described in 1990
spilotus